Eggert Þorleifsson (born 18 July 1952) is an Icelandic stage and film actor. He is best known for his acting in the Líf trilogy and Með allt á hreinu.

Personal life
Eggert is the younger brother of director and politician Þórhildur Þorleifsdóttir.

Selected filmography

 Með allt á hreinu (1982) - Dúddi
 Nýtt Líf (1983) - Þór Magnússon
 Dalalíf (1984) - Þór Magnússon
 Skammdegi (1985) - Einar
 Löggulíf (1985) - Þór Magnússon
 Stella í orlofi (1986) - Ágúst Læjónsmaður
 Sódóma Reykjavík (1992) - Aggi Flinki
 Stuttur Frakki (1993) - Egill
 Fíaskó (2000) - Samúel
 Villiljós (2001) - Albert
 Í takt við tímann (2004) - Dúddi
 Stóra planið (2008) - Haraldur
 Kurteist fólk (2011) - Markell
 Gullregn (2020) - Anton

References

External links

Living people
1952 births
Eggert Þorleifsson
Eggert Þorleifsson
Eggert Þorleifsson
Eggert Þorleifsson
Eggert Þorleifsson
Eggert Þorleifsson